José Gregorio Peña Trejo (born 12 January 1987) is a Venezuelan track and field athlete who specialises in the 3000 metres steeplechase. His personal best for the event is 8:20.87 minutes

Biography
Born in San Cristóbal, Táchira, he first established himself on the continental youth scene. His first international outing came at the 2002 South American Youth Championships in Athletics, where he came fourth in the boy's 2000 metres steeplechase race. At the 2004 edition of the competition, he won the steeplechase gold medal and also came fourth in the 1500 metres and fifth in the 3000 metres flat events. Moving up to the junior under-20 ranks, he ran at the 2005 South American Junior Championships in Athletics. There he won the 3000 m steeplechase silver medal behind Peru's Mario Bazán and he also placed eighth in the 1500 m final. He represented Venezuelan on the global stage at the 2006 World Junior Championships in Athletics, but did not progress beyond the steeplechase heats. In November 2006, he was the runner-up at the 2006 South American Games (again to Bazán) and ran a national junior record time of 8:50.88 minutes.

In Peña's first season as a senior athlete, he won the bronze medal in the steeplechase at the 2007 South American Championships in Athletics. He was also the runner-up at the 2007 ALBA Games event. He focused on longer distances in 2008, coming seventh in the South American Cross Country Championships and winning the national title over 5000 metres. At the 2008 Ibero-American Championships in Athletics he came fifth in his specialist steeplechase event.

His focus returned to steeplechasing in the 2009 season. He came second at the 2009 ALBA Games, fifth at the World Military Track and Field Championships, then ran a personal best of 8:36.17 minutes at the 2009 South American Championships in Athletics in Lima – finishing just one second behind the host nation's Mario Bazán who broke the championship record. Two weeks later, he competed at the 2009 Central American and Caribbean Championships in Athletics and won the silver medal. He won the 2010 Venezuelan steeplechase title, but missed the rest of the track season that year.

At the 2011 South American Championships in Athletics, Peña missed out on a steeplechase medal for the first time, coming in fifth place. A month later, he ran a personal best of 8:34.90 minutes at the 2011 Military World Games and was eighth in the event final. At the end of July he won the title at the 2011 ALBA Games. The 2011 Pan American Games in Guadalajara saw him achieve his best finish to date, taking the Pan American gold medal ahead of Brazil's Hudson de Souza with a tactical sprint finish. This achievement followed in the footsteps of his compatriot Néstor Nieves, who won the same event in 2003.

Peña served as the flag bearer for Venezuela at the opening ceremony of the 2014 South American Games.

Personal bests
1500 m: 3:44.06 min –  Eagle Rock, 4 May 2013
3000 m: 7:54.42 min –  Linz, 26 August 2013
5000 m: 13:47.25 min –  Stanford, 29 March 2013
3000 m steeplechase: 8:20.87 min NR –  Berlin, 1 September 2013

International competitions

References

External links

 
 
 

Living people
1987 births
Athletes (track and field) at the 2011 Pan American Games
Athletes (track and field) at the 2015 Pan American Games
Athletes (track and field) at the 2019 Pan American Games
People from San Cristóbal, Táchira
Venezuelan male steeplechase runners
Venezuelan male middle-distance runners
Venezuelan male long-distance runners
Athletes (track and field) at the 2012 Summer Olympics
Athletes (track and field) at the 2016 Summer Olympics
Olympic athletes of Venezuela
Pan American Games gold medalists for Venezuela
Pan American Games medalists in athletics (track and field)
World Athletics Championships athletes for Venezuela
Athletes (track and field) at the 2018 South American Games
South American Games gold medalists for Venezuela
South American Games silver medalists for Venezuela
South American Games medalists in athletics
Central American and Caribbean Games silver medalists for Venezuela
Competitors at the 2014 Central American and Caribbean Games
Competitors at the 2018 Central American and Caribbean Games
Central American and Caribbean Games medalists in athletics
Medalists at the 2011 Pan American Games
21st-century Venezuelan people